Tonga competed at the 2010 Commonwealth Games in Delhi, India, from 3 October – 14 October 2010. Tonga's team is expected to comprise about 20 athletes, and as many officials. Tongan athletes competed in archery, swimming, weightlifting, Rugby 7s, boxing, athletics and shooting.

The Queen's Baton arrived in Tonga in May 2010.

Tonga's first Commonwealth swimmer, Amini Fonua, reached the final of the men's 50m breaststroke, after having made the semifinal of the 100m breaststroke.

Medalist

See also 
 Nations at the 2010 Commonwealth Games

References 

2010
Nations at the 2010 Commonwealth Games
Commonwealth Games